Chinna Jeeyar (born 3 November 1956), more formally known as Sri Tridandi Srimannarayana Ramanuja Chinna Jeeyar Swami, is an Indian religious guru and yogi ascetic known for his spiritual discourses on Sri Vaishnavism. He subscribes to Thenkalai tradition of Sri Vaishnavism. He operates spiritual centers in the US. He is the designer and planner of the Statue of Equality, a statue dedicated to Ramanujacharya, in Hyderabad, India. He is also guiding Telangana State Government in the renovation of Yadadri Temple. He is one of the few Jiyars who accept non-brahmin disciples.

Jeeyar was trained in the Vaishnava tradition. At the age of 23 he took the oath to become an ascetic. He has been visiting the United States since 1994, where he taught a large number of people. He has also visited London, Singapore, Hong Kong, and Canada, where he performed Yagnas.

In December 2013, Jeeyar endorsed the Akhil Bhartiya Vidyarthi Parishad (ABVP) student organisation for instilling patriotism in students and encouraging them to learn about Indian culture. He claimed Indian culture would remain unchanged if students are acquainted with a comprehensive understanding of the country's history. He expressed the view that students play a critical role in a country's development. Jeeyar was invited by the Government of Andhra Pradesh to assist in organising the Godavari Maha Pushkaram (river festivals) in July 2015. He has spoken at the United Nations about Sustainable Development Goals.

Early life 
Chinna Jeeyar Swami was born in Andhra Pradesh, Arthmur near Rajamundry, in a traditional vedic family. His grandfather, Tridandi Srimannarayana Ramanuja Jeeyar, also known as Pedda Jeeyar Swami, mentored him and he was educated by several scholars in Sri Vaishnava system. He mastered many Sanskrit and Tamil works, Vedas, Puranas, Ithihasas, Prabandhas etc., scriptures. After taking sannyasa when was only 23, he assumed leadership when H. H. Pedda Jeeyar Swamiji died in 1981, becoming the head of Srimad Ubhaya Vedantha Acharya Peetam, Nadigaddapalem.

Later life 
Chinna Jeeyar Swami founded the Jeeyar Educational Trust (JET), with branches in places such as Hyderabad, Chennai, and the United States, to help educate students in Vedic tradition. His schools are open to everyone. In addition, he is known for his performance of Vedic rituals of peace and harmony. He speaks multiple languages and provides religious discourses in simple words. He has performed thousands of samasrayanams. His understanding of kainkarya includes modern social services such as schools for tribals and homes for the elderly, orphans, handicapped and destitute. Further, he supports rural development, science and technology schools as well as the introduction of computers for the study of Vedas.

Awards 

 2023 – Padma Bhushan by Government of India

References

External links
Official site

Indian Hindu monks
20th-century Hindu philosophers and theologians
Hindu revivalists
Living people
Telugu people
People from East Godavari district
People from Andhra Pradesh
1956 births
Recipients of the Padma Bhushan in other fields